The DR Class 83.10 was a newly designed (Neubaulok) steam locomotive built for the Deutsche Reichsbahn in East Germany after the Second World War and was introduced into service in 1955 and 1956.

The 83.10 was intended for duties on branch lines where a top speed of 60 km/h and a driving wheel diameter of 1,250 mm was sufficient. The carrying wheels and first coupled wheels worked together in a Krauss-Helmholtz bogie. The design of the Class 83.10 was based on the DR Class 65.10. The engines were fitted with superheated steam regulators, mixer-preheaters, distributed sandboxes and plate frames. They could haul a train load of up to 1,000 tonnes at 60 km/h on the level.

After the delivery of the first locomotive in 1955 the engine was fully tested at the VES-M Halle trials depot. The various tests showed numerous shortcomings, that could not all be resolved on the production models. Several problems were able to be rectified in the course of subsequent modifications. The locomotive was never really convincing and, in the light of the looming changeover to diesel operations, only 27 examples were eventually built. It remains therefore relatively unknown. One area of operations was the Arnstadt–Saalfeld line.

In 1972 the last two machines, numbers 83 1025 and 83 1027 were retired. No examples of this class have been preserved.

See also 
 List of East German Deutsche Reichsbahn locomotives and railbuses
 Neubaulok

References

External links 
 Model of an 83.10 at the  Dresden Transport Museum
 Book about the BR 83.10

83.10
2-8-4T locomotives
83.10
Railway locomotives introduced in 1955
Standard gauge locomotives of Germany
1′D2′ h2t locomotives
Freight locomotives
LKM locomotives